Cabaret Scene is an oil on canvas painting by the Spanish surrealist Salvador Dalí, executed in 1922. It was a unique cubist experiment that came between Dalí's early impressionist work and the classic surrealist technique he later developed. Dalí was inspired by Pablo Picasso after he was expelled from the School of Fine Arts in Spain.

References

dali-gallery.com

Paintings by Salvador Dalí
Surrealist paintings
1922 paintings
Food and drink paintings